Patriarch John may refer to:

 John Talaia (Patriarch John I), Patriarch of Alexandria in 481–482
 Pope John I of Alexandria, Patriarch of Alexandria in 496–505
 Pope John II (III) of Alexandria, Patriarch of Alexandria in 505–516
 Patriarch John IV of Alexandria, Greek Patriarch of Alexandria in 569–579
 Patriarch John V of Alexandria, Greek Patriarch of Alexandria in 610–619
 Patriarch John VI of Alexandria, Greek Patriarch of Alexandria in 1062–1100
 Patriarch John I of Antioch, ruled in 428–442

 Patriarch John IV of Antioch, ruled in 846–873
 John the Oxite, Greek Orthodox Patriarch of Antioch (as John IV or V) in 1089–1100

 Patriarch John X of Antioch, ruled since 2012
 John Chrysostom, Patriarch John I of Constantinople, Archbishop in 398–404
 John of Cappadocia, Patriarch John II of Constantinople, Ecumenical Patriarch in 518–520
 John Scholasticus, Patriarch John III of Constantinople, Ecumenical Patriarch in 565–577
 Patriarch John IV of Constantinople, Ecumenical Patriarch in 582–595
 Patriarch John V of Constantinople, Ecumenical Patriarch in 669–675
 Patriarch John VI of Constantinople, Ecumenical Patriarch in 712–715
 Patriarch John VII of Constantinople, Ecumenical Patriarch in 837–843
 Patriarch John VIII of Constantinople, Ecumenical Patriarch in 1064–1075
 Patriarch John IX of Constantinople, Ecumenical Patriarch in 1111–1134
 Patriarch John X of Constantinople, Ecumenical Patriarch in 1198–1206
 Patriarch John XI of Constantinople, Ecumenical Patriarch in 1275–1282
 Patriarch John XII of Constantinople, Ecumenical Patriarch in 1294–1303
 Patriarch John XIII of Constantinople, Ecumenical Patriarch in 1315–1320
 Patriarch John XIV of Constantinople, Ecumenical Patriarch in 1334–1347

See also
Patriarch John I (disambiguation)
Patriarch John II (disambiguation)
Patriarch John III (disambiguation)
Patriarch John of Alexandria (disambiguation)
Patriarch John of Constantinople (disambiguation)
Pope John (disambiguation)
John (name)